Stephen Francis Lecce  (born November 26, 1986) is a Canadian politician who has served as the Ontario minister of education since June 20, 2019. A member of the Progressive Conservative (PC) Party, Lecce is the member of Provincial Parliament (MPP) for King—Vaughan, representing the riding in the Legislative Assembly of Ontario since his election in 2018. Before running for office, Lecce worked in the Prime Minister's Office (PMO) as the director of media relations during Stephen Harper's tenure.

Early life
Lecce was born in Vaughan, Ontario, the son of Italian immigrants who came to Canada in the late 1950s. At age 13, he worked then-PC MPP Al Palladini's successful re-election campaign in 1999.

Education and early career
Lecce attended St. Margaret Mary Catholic Elementary School in Woodbridge, St. Michael's College School in Toronto, and later the University of Western Ontario, completing a Bachelor of Arts in political science. There, he was elected and served as president of UWO's University Students' Council. While studying at Western University, he was initiated into the Sigma Chi Fraternity, eventually serving as the Western Chapter's president.

After graduation, Lecce joined the Prime Minister's Office under Stephen Harper. Lecce was hired following a personal interaction with Harper in his capacity as president of Western's University Students' Council. At the PMO, Lecce served as deputy director of communications before being promoted to director of media relations.

Lecce owns a public relations consultancy firm.

Political career
Lecce ran as a Progressive Conservative in King—Vaughan and won with 29,136 votes (56.62%). On June 29, 2018, Lecce became the parliamentary assistant to Monte McNaughton, the minister of infrastructure. On July 31, Lecce became parliamentary assistant to the premier.

On June 20, 2019, he was sworn in as Ontario's minister of education. Beginning in October 2019, labour disputes between the provincial government and Ontario's four largest teachers unions (ETFO, OSSTF, OECTA, and AEFO), have caused rotating strike action. A joint strike by all four unions on February 21, 2020, marked the first province-wide closure of schools since 1997 strikes against the Harris government. Earlier that month, on February 4, New Democratic Party leader Andrea Horwath called for Doug Ford to fire Lecce as education minister, however, Ford assured that Lecce would remain in office. On February 12, Lecce called the decision for the four largest teachers unions to hold the joint strike an "irresponsible choice."

On March 12, 2020, Lecce announced that all publicly funded schools in Ontario would be closed for two weeks after March Break due to the COVID-19 pandemic in Ontario, however, the schools did not reopen as planned. On May 19, Lecce announced that schools would not reopen until the following school year in September. On July 30, Lecce announced a $309 million plan for the resumption of public education in September.

Lecce introduced Bill 28, known as the Keeping Students in Class Act, which was passed by the Legislative Assembly of Ontario on November 3, 2022, amid ongoing labour negotiations with the Canadian Union of Public Employees (CUPE). CUPE had given notice of job action October 30 after negotiations broke down with the Ministry of Education, and would have been in a legal strike position on November 4. Bill 28 imposes a contract on CUPE, and makes it illegal to strike, setting fines of $4000 for workers.

The bill invokes the notwithstanding clause, shielding it from being struck down by the courts by allowing the bill to operate despite the right to collective bargaining granted by the Canadian Charter of Rights and Freedoms. The legislation was widely condemned, including by opposition parties, the Canadian Civil Liberties Association, Prime Minister Justin Trudeau, Minister of Justice and Attorney General of Canada David Lametti, the Ontario Bar Association, and other unions including those which had previously endorsed the PC Party.

Despite Lecce's bill, CUPE went on strike anyways, resulting in province-wide protests in support of education workers against the government, and the government challenging CUPE at the Ontario Labour Relations Board. On November 7, 2022, Premier Doug Ford announced that the PCs would rescind Bill 28. It was announced that a tentative deal with CUPE was reached on December 11, 2022.

Electoral record

References

External links

Biography from the Legislative Assembly of Ontario

Progressive Conservative Party of Ontario MPPs
Members of the Executive Council of Ontario
21st-century Canadian politicians
Living people
Canadian people of Italian descent
University of Western Ontario alumni
1986 births